Independents in Espoo (in Finnish: Espoon Sitoutumattomat, in Swedish: De Obundna i Esbo) is a local political party in the municipality of Espoo, Finland. In the 2004 municipal elections the party got 4360 votes (4.3%). It got three seats in the municipal council, Timo Soini (1484 personal preference votes), Kurt Byman (360 votes) and Heidi Mikkola (317 votes).

External links
 Party website

Local political parties in Finland
Espoo